The 2009 European Parliament election in the Czech Republic was the election of members of the European Parliament (MEPs) representing the Czech Republic for the 2004–2009 term of the European Parliament. It was part of the wider 2004 European election.

These were the first European elections after the country's EU accession and hence the first to be held in the Czech Republic. They took place on 11 and 12 June 2004. On a very low turnout, the ruling Czech Social Democratic Party suffered a heavy defeat, losing ground to both the conservative Civic Democratic Party and the Communist Party of Bohemia and Moravia. The debacle of his party was one of the reasons for the resignation of Prime Minister Vladimír Špidla.

Opinion polls

Campaign finances

Results

European groups

References

External links
Detailed official results (in English); note that the numbers differ by a few votes from those given here as they were apparently corrected later

Czech
European Parliament elections in the Czech Republic
European